BIPAC (Business-Industry Political Action Committee) is a bi-partisan organization that assists employers and employees to engage in the political process. The goal is to elect "business friendly" candidates. Founded in 1963 it is one of the first PACs in America (Political action committee). As a PAC, it solicits donations from members and the general public.

History
BIPAC was founded in 1963 as “an independent, nonpartisan group to serve as a political action arm for American business and industry.” It is known as the very first business political action committee (PAC).  They conduct extensive biennial studies of employer-to-employee communications programs through both national polling and surveys within companies deploying a grassroots communications strategy.

In August 1963, members of the business community provided seed funding to establish BIPAC with the goal of electing business-friendly candidates. The group is not officially affiliated with either political party.

Operations

Several distinct legal entities operate within the framework of BIPAC: 
 The Business Institute for Political Analysis is the operations and administrative core of BIPAC. It provides the bulk of BIPAC services and programs. The Institute is a membership organization that does not lobby Congress on issues.
 The Action Fund is the non-connected political action committee of BIPAC as recognized by the Federal Election Commission. Contributions to the Action Fund can come from individuals and other PACs, but not from corporations.
 BIPAC's Prosperity Project (P2) helps businesses to promote pro-business politicians to their employees.  BIPAC's affiliated state deployment partners (those who officially host the Prosperity Project grassroots initiative in each state) include state Chambers of Commerce.
  The Friends of Adam Smith was established in November 2000 by the Board of Directors of the Business-Industry Political Action Committee (BIPAC) along with many of its members. It is charged to research and promote the historical and relevant link between politics, public policy, and economic freedom. It is a not-for-profit, fully incorporated foundation.

Initiatives
Employees Vote is a get out the vote initiative to encourage private-sector U.S. employees to vote. Employees Vote provides best practices to its network of businesses and trade groups about Get Out The Vote strategy. For instance, a business should never tell employees how to vote, but they can tell employees information about polling locations; registration for voting deadlines; information on the candidates running; and details on the issues that matter to their employer.

References

External links
 Official public website of BIPAC
 
 

Political advocacy groups in the United States
Organizations established in 1963
1963 establishments in the United States